American singer Sabrina Carpenter has released five studio albums, two extended plays, 27 singles (including three as a featured artist), 22 promotional singles and 31 music videos. In 2014, Carpenter signed a five-album deal with Hollywood Records. Carpenter's debut EP, Can't Blame a Girl for Trying, was released on April 8, 2014. She released her debut album Eyes Wide Open (2015), which debuted at number 43 on the US Billboard 200. It was preceded by its singles "Eyes Wide Open" and "We'll Be the Stars".

Carpenter released "Smoke and Fire" in 2016 but it would not be included in her second studio album Evolution (2016), which was released on October 14, 2016. The album was instead accompanied by its lead single "On Purpose". The second and last single from the album, "Thumbs", peaked at number one on the Bubbling Under Hot 100 chart and was certified Platinum by Recording Industry Association of America, becoming Carpenter's highest certified song.

Carpenter collaborated with The Vamps and Mike Perry in their single "Hands". She followed this with the single "Why", which was certified Gold by the RIAA, and then collaborated with Jonas Blue on "Alien", which peaked at number one on the US Dance Club Songs chart. She released her third studio album Singular: Act I on November 9, 2018. Its first and second singles, "Almost Love" and "Sue Me" became her second and third number-ones on the US Dance Club Songs chart. Carpenter released her fourth studio album Singular: Act II on July 19, 2019.  It was proceeded by three singles, "Pushing 20", "Exhale" and "In My Bed". She also collaborated with Alan Walker and Farruko on the song, "On My Way".

By June 2019, Marie Claire magazine reported that Carpenter had begun work on a fifth studio album. She released a string of singles in 2020 including "Honeymoon Fades" and "Let Me Move You". After departing from Hollywood Records, Carpenter was signed to Island Records in early 2021. She released the single "Skin" which debuted at number 48 on the Billboard Hot 100, becoming her first entry on the chart. This was followed with the singles "Skinny Dipping", "Fast Times" and "Vicious".

Studio albums

Extended plays

Singles

As lead artist

As featured artist

Promotional singles

Other charted songs

Other appearances

Music videos

Notes

References

Pop music discographies
Discographies of American artists